Angraecum cadetii is a species of orchid endemic to Mauritius and Réunion. It was named after botanist Thérésien Cadet.  It is the only known flower known to be pollinated by a cricket, specifically by a species of raspy cricket: Glomeremus orchidophilus.

References

External links 
Video clip of Angraecum cadetii pollination

cadetii
Plants described in 1987
Orchids of Mauritius
Orchids of Réunion